RPM was a Canadian magazine that published the best-performing singles of Canada from 1964 to 2000. During 1989, twenty-six songs became number-one singles in Canada. Chicago began the year with "Look Away" at the summit while Phil Collins' "Another Day in Paradise" was 1989's final chart-topper. Twelve artists attained the number-one spot for the first time this year: Will to Power, Edie Brickell & New Bohemians, Debbie Gibson, Mike + the Mechanics, Fine Young Cannibals, Paula Abdul, Michael Damian, Love and Rockets, Richard Marx, Milli Vanilli, Roxette, and Bad English. Madonna obtained three number-one singles this year—"Like a Prayer", "Express Yourself", and "Cherish"—while Phil Collins, Fine Young Cannibals, and Richard Marx all picked up two number-one hits.

No Canadian acts reached number one in 1989. Two songs peaked at the top for five weeks: "Like a Prayer" by Madonna and "Right Here Waiting" by Richard Marx; the former song became the most successful single of the year in Canada. Altogether, Madonna spent nine weeks at number one with her three chart-topping hits. Phil Collins totalled seven weeks at number one: a four-week stay with "Two Hearts" and a three-week stay with "Another Day in Paradise", while Richard Marx topped the chart for six combined weeks with "Right Here Waiting" and "Angelia". Fine Young Cannibals spent four weeks at number one, and those who spent at least three weeks atop the chart were Debbie Gibson with "Lost in Your Eyes" and Tears for Fears with "Sowing the Seeds of Love".

Chart history

Notes

See also
1989 in music
List of Billboard Hot 100 number ones of 1989

References

External links
 Read about RPM Magazine at the AV Trust
 Search RPM charts here at Library and Archives Canada

 
1989 record charts
1989